Adam Vayer (born 16 August 1987) is an Israeli footballer.

References

1987 births
Living people
Israeli Jews
Israeli footballers
Maccabi Netanya F.C. players
Maccabi Ironi Kiryat Ata F.C. players
Hapoel Acre F.C. players
Hapoel Bnei Tamra F.C. players
Maccabi Tzur Shalom F.C. players
Hapoel Hadera F.C. players
Israeli Premier League players
Liga Leumit players
Association football midfielders